Alfred Menezes is co-author of several books on cryptography, including the Handbook of Applied Cryptography, and is a professor of mathematics at the University of Waterloo in Canada.

Education 
Alfred Menezes' family is from Goa, a state in western India, but he was born in Tanzania and grew up in Kuwait except for a few years at a boarding school in India.  His undergraduate and post-graduate degrees are from the University of Waterloo.

Academic career 
After five years teaching at Auburn University, in 1997 he returned to the University of Waterloo, where he is now a professor of mathematics in the Department of Combinatorics and Optimization. He co-founded and is a member of the Centre for Applied Cryptographic Research, and has served as its Managing Director. Menezes' main areas of research are Elliptic Curve Cryptography (ECC), provable security, and related areas. He is a Canadian citizen.

Menezes' book Elliptic Curve Public Key Cryptosystems, published in 1993, was the first book devoted entirely to ECC.  He co-authored the widely-used reference book Handbook of Applied Cryptography. Menezes has been a conference organizer or program committee member for approximately fifty conferences on Cryptography.  He was Program Chair for Crypto 2007, and in 2012 he was an invited speaker at Eurocrypt.

In 2001 Menezes won the Hall Medal of the Institute of Combinatorics and its Applications.

Books

Selected publications 
 "Computing discrete logarithms in cryptographically-interesting characteristic-three finite fields" (with G. Adj, I. Canales-Martinez, N. Cruz-Cortes, T. Oliveira, L. Rivera-Zamarripa and F. Rodriguez-Henriquez), Cryptology ePrint Archive: Report 2016/914. https://eprint.iacr.org/2016/914
 "Another look at tightness II: Practical issues in cryptography" (with S. Chatterjee, N. Koblitz and P. Sarkar), Mycrypt 2016, Lecture Notes in Computer Science, 10311 (2017), 21–55. 
 "Another look at HMAC" (with N. Koblitz), Journal of Mathematical Cryptology, 7 (2013), 225–251. 
 "Elliptic curve cryptography: The serpentine course of a paradigm shift" (with A. H. Koblitz and N. Koblitz), Journal of Number Theory, 131 (2011), 781–814. 
 "Another look at 'provable security (with N. Koblitz), Journal of Cryptology, 20 (2007), 3–37. 
 "An efficient protocol for authenticated key agreement" (with L. Law, M. Qu, J. Solinas and S. Vanstone), Designs, Codes and Cryptography, 28 (2003), 119–134. 
 "Solving elliptic curve discrete logarithm problems using Weil descent" (with M. Jacobson and A. Stein), Journal of the Ramanujan Mathematical Society, 16 (2001), 231–260.
 "The elliptic curve digital signature algorithm (ECDSA)" (with D. Johnson and S. Vanstone), International Journal on Information Security, 1 (2001), 36–63. 
 "Analysis of the Weil descent attack of Gaudry, Hess and Smart" (with M. Qu), Topics in Cryptology – CT-RSA 2001, Lecture Notes in Computer Science, 2020 (2001), 308–318. 
 "Unknown key-share attacks on the station-to-station (STS) protocol" (with S. Blake-Wilson), Proceedings of PKC '99, Lecture Notes in Computer Science, 1560 (1999), 154–170. 
 "Reducing elliptic curve logarithms to logarithms in a finite field" (with T. Okamoto and S. Vanstone), IEEE Transactions on Information Theory, 39 (1993), 1639–1646.

See also
 List of University of Waterloo people

References

External links 
 DBLP Publication list

Modern cryptographers
Living people
1965 births
University of Waterloo alumni
Academic staff of the University of Waterloo
20th-century Canadian mathematicians
21st-century Canadian mathematicians
Public-key cryptographers